Serine protease inhibitor Kazal-type 6 (SPINK6) is a protein encoded by the SPINK6 gene in humans. It is a potent inhibitor of epidermal proteases involved in maintaining skin homeostasis, including KLK5, KLK7 and KLK14. SPINK6 is a member of a gene family cluster located on chromosome 5q33.1, which includes SPINK5 and SPINK9.

See also
Kazal-type serine protease inhibitor domain

References

Proteins